In the Federal Republic of Nigeria, Executive Councils (informally known as Cabinets) in the states of Nigeria are the highest formal governmental body in state governments headed by state governors.

Functions 
The Executive Council is responsible for advising and assisting the Governor in the performance of their official duties. As all of its members excluding the Deputy Governor are appointed by the Governor, individuals who have been appointed to serve in the Council may also be dismissed or reappointed to other posts at the Governor's discretion. The entire council may also be dissolved if the Governor wishes for a complete reshuffle or a motion of no confidence is passed in the Governor.

General structure 
It usually (depending on the state) consists of the Governor, the Deputy Governor, Secretary to the State Government, Chief of Staff, Head of the State Civil Service, Commissioners who preside over ministerial departments, along with the special aides and advisers to the Governor and their deputies. The Governor designates duties to commissioners, who are in turn assigned portfolios within their areas of responsibility.

List of executive councils 

 Executive Council of Abia State
 Executive Council of Adamawa State
 Executive Council of Akwa Ibom State
 Executive Council of Anambra State
 Executive Council of Bauchi State
 Executive Council of Bayelsa State
 Executive Council of Benue State
 Executive Council of Borno State
 Executive Council of Cross River State
 Executive Council of Delta State
 Executive Council of Ebonyi State
 Executive Council of Edo State
 Executive Council of Ekiti State
 Executive Council of Enugu State
 Executive Council of Gombe State
 Executive Council of Imo State
 Executive Council of Jigawa State
 Executive Council of Kaduna State
 Executive Council of Kano State
 Executive Council of Katsina State
 Executive Council of Kebbi State
 Executive Council of Kogi State
 Executive Council of Kwara State
 Executive Council of Lagos State
 Executive Council of Nasarawa State
 Executive Council of Niger State
 Executive Council of Ogun State
 Executive Council of Ondo State
 Executive Council of Osun State
 Executive Council of Oyo State
 Executive Council of Plateau State
 Executive Council of Rivers State
 Executive Council of Sokoto State
 Executive Council of Taraba State
 Executive Council of Yobe State
 Executive Council of Zamfara State

See also 

 Executive Council (South Africa)

References 

State executive councils of Nigeria